The Asem dam is a dam in Saudi Arabia opened in 1984 and located in Asir region.

See also 

 List of dams in Saudi Arabia

References 

Dams in Saudi Arabia